The 2021 Horizon League baseball tournament was held from May 27 through 29 at Nischwitz Stadium in Fairborn, Ohio, on the campus of Wright State University. The annual tournament determines the tournament champion of Division I Horizon League in college baseball. The tournament champion will then earn the conference's automatic bid to the 2021 NCAA Division I baseball tournament.

Tournament

Bracket

References

Tournament
Horizon League Baseball Tournament
Horizon League baseball tournament
Horizon League baseball tournament
Baseball competitions in Ohio
College sports tournaments in Ohio
Fairborn, Ohio